The Golden Flute is an album by American jazz multi-instrumentalist Yusef Lateef featuring performances recorded in 1966 for the Impulse! label.

Reception
The Allmusic review by Scott Yanow stated: "Lateef has long been a true original, and he revitalizes the standards while always swinging and being a bit unpredictable. Well worth searching for".

Track listing
All compositions by Yusef Lateef except as noted.
 "Road Runner" - 4:47
 "Straighten Up and Fly Right" (Nat King Cole, Irving Mills) - 3:28
 "Oasis" - 4:26
 "I Don't Stand a Ghost of a Chance with You" (Bing Crosby, Ned Washington, Victor Young) - 4:06
 "Exactly Like You" (Dorothy Fields, Jimmy McHugh) - 2:57
 "The Golden Flute" - 3:56
 "Rosetta" (Earl Hines, Henri Woode) - 3:54
 "Head Hunters" (Barry Harris, Hugh Lawson) - 4:35
 "The Smart Set" (Roy Brooks) - 7:31

Recorded on June 15, 1966 (tracks 1, 3, 4, 7 & 8) and June 16, 1966 (tracks 2, 5, 6 & 9)

Personnel
Yusef Lateef – tenor saxophone, flute, oboe
Hugh Lawson – piano
Herman Wright – bass
Roy Brooks Jr. – drums

References

Impulse! Records albums
Yusef Lateef albums
1967 albums
Albums recorded at Van Gelder Studio
Albums produced by Bob Thiele